Chester, Pennsylvania, can refer to a location in the U.S. state of Pennsylvania:

 Chester, Pennsylvania, city in Delaware County 
 Chester County, Pennsylvania
 Chester Township, Delaware County, Pennsylvania
 West Chester, Pennsylvania, a borough in Chester County, Pennsylvania
 Chester Springs, Pennsylvania